Liederjan is a north-German folk group. It originated as Tramps & Hawkers, which played Irish traditional music in the early 1970s. They gradually started playing German folk music, and in 1975 formed the group Liederjan. 

The principal members of the band were Anselm Noffke (died 2003), Jörg Ermisch und Jochen Wiegandt.  Others who played with Liederjan were Rainer Prüss, Edzard Wagenaar, Wolfgang Rieck, Jürgen Leo, Klaus Irmscher, and currently Hanne Balzer and Michael Lempelius.

Discography 

 1976	Live aus der Fabrik
 1978	Mädchen, Meister, Mönche
 1979	Volkslieder aus der heilen Welt
 1980	Liederbuch
 1981	Der Mann mit dem Hut
 1981	Es kann ja nicht immer so bleiben – Ausgabe BRD
 1982	He, ik mach di
 1983	Es kann ja nicht immer so bleiben – Ausgabe DDR
 1983	Unsre Klingel ist kaputt
 1985	Idiotenclub
 1988	Mit der Torte durch die Tür
 1990	Klammheimliche Hits der frühen Achtziger (compilation)
 1990	Land in Sicht
 1994	Wie im Paradies
 1996	Die Wirrtuosen
 1999	Loses zum Fest
 2002	Ach, du meine Goethe
 2003	Drei Gesellen (compilation)
 2003	Wir 3
 2004	Anselm
 2005	Spielen Sie auch Gitarre?
 2007	Einmal Canossa und zurück
 2008	Prost Franz – Trinklieder aus fünf Jahrhunderten
 2010  Liedertach (together with Iontach)
 2010  7/8, oder am Stück
 2010  Lustig, lustig, ihr lieben Brüder
 2011  Geschenkt
 2013  Eins, zwei: Drei im Sauseschritt (Liederjan trifft Wilhelm Busch)
 2015  40 Jahre – Sowieso
 2018 Ernsthaft locker bleiben

References

External links 
 liederjan.de Homepage.

German folk music groups